was a video game developer founded in May 1986, based in Mukoujima, Sumida-ku, Tokyo. They were most famous for the Wonder Boy/Monster World series. Originally called , the company was renamed to Westone as the word Escape made them sound unreliable. The company's name was changed yet again to Westone Bit Entertainment in April 2000.  The chief publisher was Ryuichi Nishizawa. The company went bankrupt and entered the liquidation process on October 1, 2014.

The Westone name is derived from the first characters of the names of company founders, Ryuuichi Nishizawa (Nishi = West) and Michishito Ishizuka (Ishi = Stone).

Games
Wonder Boy (1986)
Jaws (1987)
Wonder Boy in Monster Land (1987)
Wonder Boy III: Monster Lair (1988)
Appare! Gateball (1988)
Wonder Boy III: The Dragon's Trap (1989)
Mashin Eiyuden Wataru Gaiden (1990)
Aoi Blink (1990)
Aurail (1990)
Wonder Boy in Monster World (1991)
Power Eleven (1991)
Riot City (1991)
Riot Zone (1992)
Monster World IV (1994)
Blood Gear (1994)
Mega Bomberman (1994)
Dungeon Explorer (1995)
Kekkon (1995)
Dark Half (1996)
Wolkenkratzer: Shinpan no Tou (1996)
Willy Wombat (1997)
Soukou Kihei Votoms Gaiden: Ao no Kishi Berserga Monogatari (1997)
Sotsugyou Album (1998)
Sotsugyou III: Wedding Bell (1998)
Sotsugyou M: Male Graduation - Seitokaichou no Kareinaru Inbou (1998)
Wachenröder (1998)
Milano no Arbeit Collection (1999)
Cyber Team in Akihabara: PataPies! (1999)
Di Gi Charat Fantasy (2001)
Reel Fishing: Wild (2001)
Neon Genesis Evangelion: Ayanami Raising Project (2001)
Neon Genesis Evangelion: Ayanami Raising Project with Asuka Supplementing Project (2003)
Relaxuma: Ojama Shitemasu 2 Shuukan (2005)
Secret of Evangelion (2006)
Clockwork Aquario (2021)

References

External links
 via Internet Archive 
Westone at MobyGames
Westone at GameFAQs

Japanese companies established in 1986
Japanese companies disestablished in 2014
Defunct video game companies of Japan
Software companies based in Tokyo
Video game companies established in 1986
Video game companies disestablished in 2014